Pseneo punctatus is a species of aphid wasp in the family Crabronidae. It is found in Central America and North America.

Subspecies
These three subspecies belong to the species Pseneo punctatus:
 Pseneo punctatus carolina (Rohwer, 1910)
 Pseneo punctatus ferrugineus (Viereck, 1901)
 Pseneo punctatus punctatus (W. Fox, 1898)

References

Crabronidae
Articles created by Qbugbot
Insects described in 1898